Dr Dame Joyce Margaretta Daws DBE FRCS FRACS FAMA (21 July 1925 – 13 June 2007) was an Australian-based British doctor who specialised in thoracic surgery at various hospitals for over twenty years, primarily in Melbourne. She held the post of Consultant Surgeon of Melbourne.

Education
The Hounslow-born Daws settled in Australia in 1956, having been educated at Royal School for Naval and Marine Officers' Daughters, St Paul's Girls' School, the Royal Free Hospital and University of London.

Selected affiliations
Member, Victorian Nursing Council  (1974-2007)
President of the Cancer Institute of Victoria (and board member; 1978–80)
Chairman, Victorian Nursing Council (1983–89)
Chairman, International Protea Association (1987–96)
Member, Victorian Medical Women's Society

Death
Dr Dame Joyce Daws died in Victoria on 13 June 2007, aged 81, from undisclosed causes and left $10,000 to the Nurses Board of Victoria (NBV).

Honours
She was appointed Dame Commander of the Order of the British Empire on 14 June 1975 "for her services to medicine".

Legacy
Dame Joyce Daws Churchill Fellowship Grant

References

External links
University of Melbourne/Bright Sparcs Archival and Heritage
Royal Free Hospital newsletter (PDF)

1925 births
2007 deaths
Alumni of the University of London
Australian Fellows of the Royal College of Surgeons
Australian women philanthropists
Australian philanthropists
Australian surgeons
British emigrants to Australia
British surgeons
English women medical doctors
Australian Dames Commander of the Order of the British Empire
Fellows of the Royal Australasian College of Surgeons
Fellows of the Australian Medical Association
People educated at St Paul's Girls' School
People from Hounslow
Medical doctors from Melbourne
20th-century British philanthropists
20th-century surgeons
20th-century English women
20th-century English people
20th-century women philanthropists